Yarm Methodist Church is a Methodist church in the town of Yarm in the borough of Stockton-on-Tees, England. It is octagonal in shape. Built in 1763, John Wesley wrote in his Journal :
I preached about noon at Potto and in the evening in the New House at Yarm, by far the most elegant in England. A large congregational attended at five in the morning and seemed to be just ripe for the exhortation – Let us go on and perfection.
Administratively, the church is part of the Stockton Circuit in the Darlington district. The current minister is the Rev Moira Peters.

The Church has a children's Youth Club for 9 to 18-year-olds, and a mothers and toddlers group.

See also
St Mary Magdalene, Yarm – the Church of England parish church.

References

External links
Yarm Methodist Church

Methodist churches in North Yorkshire
Yarm
Octagonal churches in the United Kingdom